Cho Chang-ho, a Korean name consisting of the family name Cho and the masculine given name Chang-ho, may refer to:

 Cho Chang-ho (soldier)
 Cho Chang-ho (film director)